Wheatville may refer to the following places in the United States:

 The former name of Kingsburg, California
 Wheatville, New York, a place in New York
 Wheatville, Ohio
 Wheatville, Austin, a former neighborhood in Austin, Texas

See also
 Wheathill (disambiguation)